The 1970 German Grand Prix was a Formula One motor race held at the Hockenheimring on 2 August 1970. It was race 8 of 13 in both the 1970 World Championship of Drivers and the 1970 International Cup for Formula One Manufacturers. The 50-lap race was won by Lotus driver Jochen Rindt after he started from second position. Jacky Ickx finished second for the Ferrari team and McLaren driver Denny Hulme came in third.

On short notice following the drivers' demand for improved safety at the Nürburgring, the race was moved to Hockenheim for the first time in the history of the German Grand Prix as this track already had been fitted with Armco. F1 returned to an updated Nürburgring in 1971.

This was Rindt's final win in his career before his death at the Italian Grand Prix that year at Monza.

Qualifying

Qualifying classification

Race

Classification

Championship standings after the race

Drivers' Championship standings

Constructors' Championship standings

Note: Only the top five positions are included for both sets of standings.

References

German Grand Prix
German Grand Prix
German Grand Prix